Pulham St Mary was a station in Pulham St Mary, Norfolk on the Waveney Valley Line which is now closed. The station has been demolished.

References

External links
 Pulham St Mary station on 1946 O. S. map

Disused railway stations in Norfolk
Former Great Eastern Railway stations
Railway stations in Great Britain opened in 1855
Railway stations in Great Britain closed in 1953